Queen of Time is the thirteenth studio album by Finnish heavy metal band Amorphis, released worldwide on 18 May 2018 through Nuclear Blast. This is the first album since 1999's Tuonela to feature original bassist Olli-Pekka Laine who rejoined the band in 2017, making this the first time since 1994's Tales from the Thousand Lakes that all four original band members played together on an album. The album was produced by Jens Bogren, who was described as "a true brother in spirit."

Critical reception
Queen of Time received positive reviews upon release.

Blabbermouth praised the use of a variety of instruments such as flutes, saxophone, reeds, or xylophones, calling the compositions "long, layered and resonant".

Louder wrote: "Amorphis are incredible songwriters; everything from stirring opener The Bee through to lavish, dramatic closer Pyres On The Coast boasts at least one life-affirming hook, and vocalist Tomi Joutsen has never sounded more commanding."

Track listing

Personnel

Amorphis
 Tomi Joutsen – vocals
 Esa Holopainen – lead guitar
 Tomi Koivusaari – rhythm guitar
 Olli-Pekka Laine – bass
 Santeri Kallio – keyboards, engineering (church organ)
 Jan Rechberger – drums

Miscellaneous staff
 Chrigel Glanzmann – tin whistle, low whistle
 Noa Gruman – arrangements (choirs), conductor
 Albert Kuvezin – laryngeal singing on "The Bee"
 Akira Takasaki – guitar solo on "Honeyflow" (bonus track)
 Jørgen Munkeby – saxophone on "Daughter of Hate"
 Linus Corneliusson – mixing assistance
 Valnoir Mortasonge – artwork

Additional vocalists
 Anneke van Giersbergen – female vocals on "Amongst Stars"
 Noa Gruman – female vocals (additional) (tracks 1, 2, 4)
 Hellscore Choir – choir vocals (tracks 2, 3, 5, 6, 8)

Charts

References

2015 albums
Amorphis albums
Nuclear Blast albums
Albums produced by Jens Bogren